The Haveli Tehsil is a tehsil of the Poonch district in the Indian union territory of Jammu and Kashmir. It is headquartered at the Poonch Town.

History 
The History of Poonch District of the princely state of Jammu and Kashmir had four tehsils: Haveli and Mendhar in the east, and Bagh and Sudhanoti in the west.

As a result of the First Kashmir War of 1947, the Haveli tehsil got bifurcated, with the northern half passing into Pakistani control and the southern half remaining in Indian-administered Kashmir. The Pakistani half of the tehsil has now been made into a district.

The Haveli tehsil of the Indian-administered Kashmir was further bifurcated into the present Haveli tehsil and the Mandi tehsil based at Mandi.

Administration
The Haveli tehsil is headquartered at Poonch.

Demographics

The total projected population of Haveli Tehsil is 132,767, with 71,538 males and 61,229 females according to the 2011 census of India. The population includes Paharis, Gujjars, Bakerwals and Kashmiris.

Transportation

Air
Poonch Airport is a non-operational airstrip in the tehsil headquarters Poonch. The nearest airport to Poonch is Sheikh ul-Alam International Airport in Srinagar, located 180 kilometres from Poonch.

Rail
There is no railway connectivity to Poonch yet. There are plans to construct a Jammu–Poonch line which will connect Jammu with Poonch with railways. The nearest major railway station is Jammu Tawi railway station located 235 kilometres from Poonch.

Road
The tehsil is well-connected to other places in Jammu and Kashmir and India by the NH 144A and other intra-district roads.

See also
Poonch
Jammu and Kashmir
Rajouri
Surankote
Jammu

References

External links

 The Official Website of Jammu and Kashmir Government, India
 Official Website of District Poonch, India
 Poonch Tehsil map, mapsofindia.com.

Poonch district, India